James Nicholas Counter III (1940–2009) was a labor attorney and the long-standing president of the Alliance of Motion Picture and Television Producers and chief negotiator for the major studios who squared off against Hollywood's writers during a 100-day strike in 2008. He was a fixture in Hollywood labor circles, having overseen some 400 labor contracts with writers, actors, film crews, musicians and scores of other professionals. He served as AMPTP's president for 27 years and was the chief negotiator for 311 major labor pacts, including six in 2008. He retired in February 2009. For most of his tenure, Counter presided over a tremulous period of relative labor calm, except for two massive  strikes that rocked Hollywood, in 1988 and 2008, both by the Writers Guild of America.

Over the years, Counter was sometimes praised by his colleagues for giving the often-fractious alliance a unified voice, a task that became increasingly trying as studios became facets of media conglomerates with diverse businesses. The group has sometimes had difficulty reaching consensus, perhaps because it represents more than 350 film and television producers, including major media giants that are fierce competitors. At the same time, Counter's pugnacious style and tactics—which included trying to stare down opponents and publicly rebuking union officials who angered him—also made him the nemesis of many workers, especially during the most recent writers strike, when he was criticized as tone-deaf to their concerns. In the heat of negotiations with the Writers Guild in 2004 Counter gave a speech paying tribute to Daniel Petrie Jr., the director and father of the former guild president.

Early life
Born in Phoenix on March 21, 1940, Counter grew up in the Denver area. During summers, he worked in a Colorado steel mill where his father rose from salesman to vice president. The experience piqued his interest in labor issues. "What I learned was that unions come about because of bad management," he said in an interview with The Times in 2007. Counter was an amateur boxer and a star football player in high school, later playing halfback at the University of Colorado, where he earned a full Boettcher Scholarship to study electrical engineering.

He shifted to law, studying at Stanford University before becoming a labor attorney in Los Angeles. The studios tapped him in 1982 to unify the newly formed alliance, whose members had previously squabbled over how labor negotiations should be conducted. "I planned on doing it for three years and then getting back to my practice," Counter said.

Career
Counter stipulated that companies act with one voice, viewing a "strike against one as a strike against all." Instead of responding to union demands, he made companies craft proposals. His biggest challenge came six years later during the 1988 Writers Guild of America strike that lasted 22 weeks. Counter and his labor counterparts became convinced that future disruptions could be avoided if negotiations began well before contract's expired. The approach worked well, at least until fall 2007, when the writers—fearful that studios were shortchanging their future in the Internet era—again went on strike. The walkout followed weeks of acrimonious talks between Counter and guild officials.

He served as a trustee on 14 of the guild and union health and pension funds and also as a trustee for the Motion Picture & Television Fund.

Death 
Counter died November 6, 2009 at the age of 69. "Nick's passing is a profound loss for the entire entertainment community," said AMPTP President Carol Lombardini. "We will all remember Nick for his passionate leadership, which was always guided by a resolute sense of fair play and an earnest desire that everyone come out a winner."

"Although we sat on opposite sides during labor negotiations, Nick was a friend, man of honor and worthy adversary, doing his best to represent his constituents," Directors Guild of America Secretary-Treasurer Gilbert Cates and National Executive Director Jay Roth said in a statement. "We shared the same goal – protecting our industry – yet often held different ideas at times about how to accomplish this. But ultimately Nick would always listen, evaluate and try to understand where we were coming from and look for a way to find a deal that worked for both parties."

He is survived by a son, Nicholas; a daughter, Samantha, and her husband, producer and screenwriter Alex Kurtzman; and a grandson, Jack.

External links
J. Nicholas Counter, III biography via Alliance of Motion Picture and Television Producers

1940 births
2009 deaths
20th-century American lawyers
Stanford University alumni
People from Phoenix, Arizona
Place of death missing
University of Colorado alumni